Poyntonophrynus, also known as pygmy toads, are a genus consisting of ten true toad species native to Sub-Saharan Africa. Originally, all Poyntonophrynus species were included in the genus Bufo. The genus was split due to large enough taxonomic divergence as evidenced by molecular markers.

Taxonomy and systematics
Poyntonophrynus corresponds to the former Bufo vertebralis group. Poyntonophrynus is the sister taxon of Mertensophryne. Some molecular studies have suggested polyphyly of Poyntonophrynus, but the conclusion is likely to have been caused by sequences representing a different species than assumed.

Description
Poyntonophrynus are small toads. They lack a tarsal fold, and their parotoid glands are indistinct and
flattened. The tympanum is small but distinct.

Species
The species in this genus are:
 Poyntonophrynus beiranus (Loveridge, 1932)
 Poyntonophrynus damaranus (Mertens, 1954)
 Poyntonophrynus dombensis (Bocage, 1895)
 Poyntonophrynus fenoulheti (Hewitt and Methuen, 1912)
 Poyntonophrynus grandisonae (Poynton and Haacke, 1993)
 Poyntonophrynus hoeschi (Ahl, 1934)
 Poyntonophrynus kavangensis (Poynton and Broadley, 1988)
 Poyntonophrynus lughensis (Loveridge, 1932)
 Poyntonophrynus pachnodes Ceríaco, Marques, Bandeira, Agarwal, Stanley, Bauer, Heinicke, and Blackburn, 2018
 Poyntonophrynus parkeri (Loveridge, 1932)
 Poyntonophrynus vertebralis (Smith, 1848)

Sclerophrys urunguensis likely belongs to this genus, but remains formally in Sclerophrys (former Amietophrynus).

References

 
Amphibians of Sub-Saharan Africa
Taxa named by Jonathan A. Campbell
Taxa named by John Douglas Lynch